Sir Thomas Ormsby, 3rd Baronet (26 May 1795 – 9 August 1833) succeeded as 3rd Baronet in November 1821. He was a member of Marylebone Cricket Club (MCC) and made a single appearance in first-class cricket, taking part in the 1829 Married v Single match.

References

1795 births
1833 deaths
Baronets in the Baronetage of the United Kingdom
English cricketers
English cricketers of 1826 to 1863
Married v Single cricketers